The Embassy of the Co-operative Republic of Guyana to the United States of America is located at 2490 Tracy Place, NW, Washington, DC. The Permanent Mission of Guyana to the Organization of American States (OAS) is also located there. The Embassy of Guyana was established in 1966, and the Permanent Mission in 1991.

Riyad Insanally, CCH was appointed Guyana's eighth Ambassador to the US and fourth Permanent Representative to the OAS.

In executing and promoting the foreign policy objectives of the Government of Guyana, the Embassy seeks to:

 Uphold Guyana's sovereignty and territorial integrity;
 Strengthen political and economic relations with the United States and other nations represented in Washington, DC and at the OAS;
 Promote and facilitate investment, trade, business and tourism opportunities for Guyana; and
 Attend to the consular needs of Guyanese residents in the US, as well as supporting Guyanese nationals wishing to remigrate.

In addition to the Embassy in Washington, DC, there is a Consulate General in New York City and Honorary Consuls in Atlanta, Georgia; Miami, Florida; and Los Angeles, California.

References

External links

Official website
wikimapia

Guyana
Washington, D.C.
Guyana–United States relations